Total Beauty Media, based in Los Angeles, operates totalbeauty.com, which provides beauty tips, news, reviews, and reporting on beauty industry trends.

History
The company was founded in 2007 by Emrah Kovacoglu, a former Procter & Gamble digital media executive. By February 2008, the company raised $10 million from Wallington Investments and U.S. Venture Partners.

In August 2010, it acquired LimeLife.

In 2012, it launched a web show.

In March 2015, the company was acquired by Evolve Media.

References

Online publishing companies of the United States
Beauty organisations